James Baker (born 1930) is an American attorney and statesman.

James, Jim(mie), Jimmy, or Jamie Baker may also refer to:

Lawyers
 James A. Baker (born 1821) (1821–1897), American jurist and politician; often called "Judge Baker"
 James A. Baker (born 1857) (1857–1941), American attorney often called "Captain Baker"
 James A. Baker Jr. (1892–1973), American attorney
 James A. Baker (government attorney), American attorney and FBI general counsel from 2014 to 2017.

Musicians
 James "Iron Head" Baker (fl. 1930s–1940s), African American traditional folk singer
 James Baker (musician) (born 1954), Australian rock drummer and songwriter
 James Baker (composer) (fl. 2000s–2010s), composer and percussionist with the New York City Ballet Orchestra
 BlocBoy JB or James Baker (born 1996), American musician

Public officials
 James Baker (Roundhead) (died 1689), English lawyer and politician
 James A. Baker (born 1821) (1821–1897), American jurist and politician in Texas
 James McNair Baker (1821–1892), American jurist and politician in the Confederate Senate during Civil War
 James H. Baker (politician) (1829–1913), politician who was Ohio Secretary of State and Minnesota Secretary of State
 James H. Baker (DOD), American foreign policy advisor
 James Baker (Canadian politician) (1830–1906), British soldier and politician in British Columbia, Canada
 James Marion Baker (1861–1940), 11th Secretary of the United States Senate
 James A. Baker (justice) (1931–2008), American jurist who served on the Texas Supreme Court from 1995 to 2003
 James M. Baker (mayor) (born 1942), mayor of Wilmington, Delaware from 2001 to 2013
 James M. Baker (Virginia politician) (1845–1927), member of the Virginia House of Delegates
 James E. Baker (born 1960), Chief Judge of the United States Court of Appeals for the Armed Forces
 James A. Baker (government attorney) (fl. 1980s–2010s), American DOJ official; Counsel for Intelligence Policy; former counsel at Twitter, Inc.
 Jim Baker (politician) (fl. 2000s–2010s), Canadian legislator from Labrador West in Newfoundland/Labrador House of Assembly
 James O. Baker, candidate in the 2010 United States House of Representatives elections in Missouri

Religious figures
 James Chamberlain Baker (1879–1969), American Bishop of Methodist Episcopal Church and United Methodist Church
 Father Yod or James Edward Baker (1922–1975), American spiritual leader
 Jim Bakker (born 1940), American televangelist at the center of a sex scandal and accounting fraud

Sportspeople
 James Baker (English cricketer) (1792–1839), English cricketer mostly for Sussex 
 James Clark Baker (1866–1939), New Zealand cricketer
 James Mitchell Baker (1878–1956), South African Olympic runner
 Jim Baker (footballer) (1891–1966), English professional centre back during the 1910s and 1920s for Leeds United A.F.C.
 Jimmy Baker (footballer, born 1904) (1904–1979), Welsh-born football wing half who played for Coventry City
 James Baker (footballer, born 1911) (1911–1974), English football player
 Jimmie Baker (basketball) (born 1953), American basketball player
 Jim Baker (bowls) (born 1958), Northern Irish and combined Irish lawn and indoor bowls player
 Jamie Baker (ice hockey) (born 1966), Canadian professional hockey centre and sports broadcaster
 Jamie Baker (tennis) (born 1986), British former tennis player
 James Baker (New Zealand cricketer) (born 1988), New Zealand cricketer for Northern Districts

Other people

 Jim Baker (frontiersman) (1818–1898), American trapper, scout and guide
 James Baker (university president) (1848–1925), American academic administrator
 James A. Baker (trade unionist) (before 1875–after 1903), Canadian miner and trade unionist
 James Gilbert Baker (1914–2005), American astronomer and optics expert
 Jimmy Baker (Australian artist) (c. 1915–2010), Australian Aboriginal artist
 Jimmie Baker (television producer) (1920–2003), American television producer
 A. J. Baker or Jim Baker (1922–2017), Australian philosopher
 D. James Baker (born 1937), American oceanographer
 Jim B. Baker (1941–2014), American actor
 James Robert Baker (1947–1997), American author
 James Baker, art collector who owned the Museum of Contemporary Art, Brisbane, 1987–1994
 James K. Baker (fl. 1970s–2000s), founder of Dragon Systems
 Jimmy Baker (American artist) (born 1980), American artist

See also
 Baker (surname)
 James B. Baker House, historic home in Aberdeen, Maryland, United States
 James Baker Institute, public policy think tank at Rice University, Houston, Texas, United States